Turn the World Around is a studio album by country music singer Eddy Arnold. It was released in 1967 by RCA Victor.

The album debuted on Billboard magazine's Top Country Albums chart on March 4, 1967, held the No. 1 spot for three weeks, and remained on the chart for a total of 31 weeks. The album included the No. 1 hit, "Lonely Again".

AllMusic gave the album a rating of three stars. Reviewer Greg Adams praised the "lush pop" and wrote that the entire album was "an easy listening pleasure."

Track listing
Side A
 "Lonely Again"
 "Did It Rain"
 "That's All I Want from You"
 "Infant"
 "Oh So Far from Home"
 "When Your World Stops Turning"

Side B
 "Meet Me at the Altar"
 "Mary Who"
 "Nobody's Darling but Mine"
 "He's Got You"
 "Bear with Me a Little Longer"
 "The Wheel of Hurt"

References

1967 albums
Eddy Arnold albums
RCA Victor albums